Nanchang East railway station is a railway station currently under construction in Qingshanhu District, Nanchang, Jiangxi, China. It will be served by Nanchang–Jingdezhen–Huangshan high-speed railway, Nanchang–Jiujiang high-speed railway and Nanchang–Ganzhou high-speed railway.

Design
The station will have an arched structure.

Nanchang Metro
Nanchang East railway station will be served by Lines 2 (extension under construction) and 5 (under planning) of Nanchang Metro. Provision is also being provided for an additional north–south line.

See also
Nanchang railway station
Nanchang West railway station

References

Railway stations in Jiangxi